John Coxon (7 April 1922 – May 1998) was an English amateur footballer who played as a full back in the Football League for Darlington.

Coxon was born in Whitley Bay, which was then in Northumberland. He played football for non-league club Old Hartley, and by March 1946 had joined Darlington; he appeared twice in the wartime third-tier competition. He remained with the club until at least 1948, but made only one appearance in the Third Division North, in the 1946–47 season. He died in May 1998 in North Tyneside, Tyne and Wear.

References

1922 births
1998 deaths
People from Whitley Bay
Footballers from Tyne and Wear
English footballers
Association football fullbacks
Darlington F.C. players
English Football League players